Kunal Choudhary is an Indian National Congress politician from the state of Madhya Pradesh, India. He is a member of Madhya Pradesh Legislative Assembly elected from  Kalapipal Assembly constituency.

Electoral Performance

References

Living people
1982 births
Indian National Congress politicians from Madhya Pradesh
Madhya Pradesh MLAs 2018–2023